Laskowski (feminine: Laskowska, plural: Laskowscy) is a Polish surname. It may refer to:

 Chris Laskowski (born 1981), American football player
 Irena Laskowska (1925–2019), Polish actress
 Jacek Laskowski (born 1967), Polish sports commentator
 John Laskowski (born 1953), American basketball player
 Karolina Laskowska (born 1992), British fashion designer
 Kazimierz Laskowski (1899–1961), Polish fencer and military officer
 Mark Laskowski (born 1968), American voice actor
 Natalia Bamber-Laskowska (born 1982), Polish volleyball player
 Paweł Hulka-Laskowski (1881–1946), Polish writer
 Philip Laskowsky (1889–1960), Polish and American Yiddish theatre composer
 Roman Laskowski (1936–2014), Polish linguist
 Tomasz Laskowski (born 1984), Polish footballer
 Zygmunt Laskowski (1841–1928), Polish physician

See also
 
 

Polish-language surnames